Anandsami is an Indian film and stage actor who has worked on Tamil, Malayalam and Hindi productions. In films, Anandsami had a career breakthrough with appearances in Lens (2016) and Odu Raja Odu (2018).

Career
In 2001, Anandsami was a part of the Tamil remake of the Hindi television series Kyunki Saas Bhi Kabhi Bahu Thi. He appeared in ten episodes, and has since noted that being a part of the show prompted to become more professional with his approach to acting. After completing work on the series, Anandsami created a portfolio and attempted to become an actor in Tamil cinema. Finding chances hard to come by, he joined the Chennai-based theatre troupe Koothu-P-Pattarai in 2002, where he performed for eight years, before moving on to work with another group, Perch. Despite making small appearances in films and television during the 2000s, Anandsami was able to establish himself as a prominent theatre actor in the Chennai acting circuit.

Anandsami was also a part of the trio that performs Kira Kozhambu, a play based on writer Ki Rajanarayanan's folk tales. He acted in the play with Ravindra Vijay and Kalieaswari Srinivasan in Coimbatore, and reenacted the same play with Maya S. Krishnan reprising Srinivasan's part in Chennai. The play was based on Ki. Rajanarayanan's collection of short stories titled Nattuppura Kadhai Kalanjiyam with Anandsami reprising his role from the original play. A critic stated that "Actors Anand Sami, Maya S. Krishnan and Ravindra Vijay were in their elements with their seamless blend of art and entertainment".

Anandsami is also known for his solo play, Jannal and Seethaimark Seeyakkai Thool where he performs writer Sundara Ramaswamy's short shorties of the same name. He was also part of an ensemble cast of actors that performed The Water Station, directed by Sankar Venkateswaran of Theatre Roots and Wings at the Kyoto International Performing Arts Festival

In film, Anandsami's most notable role was in Jayaprakash Radhakrishnan's directorial debut Lens, a thriller about web voyeurism. He was also seen in the 2018 black comedy Odu Raja Odu. In 2021, Anandsami was seen in Amazon Prime's The Family Man portraying a Sri Lankan Tamil rebel fighter.

Filmography
Films

Web series

References

External links

Living people
21st-century Indian dramatists and playwrights
Indian male stage actors
21st-century Indian male actors
Male actors from Chennai
Indian male film actors
Tamil male actors
Male actors in Tamil cinema
Male actors in Hindi cinema
Male actors in Malayalam cinema
Year of birth missing (living people)